Cloonshanville High Cross is a high cross which is a National Monument in County Roscommon, Ireland.

Location

References

National Monuments in County Roscommon
High crosses in the Republic of Ireland
Religion in County Roscommon